Begal (or Bigal) is an area within the Salarzai Tehsil of the Bajaur District in Khyber Pakhtunkhwa, Pakistan. The population was 1,314 in the 2017 national census.

References 

Populated places in Bajaur District